Nguyễn Thị Bích(阮氏碧), also known as Nguyễn Nhược Thị Bích (阮若氏碧, An Phuớc District, Ninh Thuận, 1830–1909) was a Vietnamese poet. She was a literate lady at the Huế court whose experiences in the 1885 flight of Hàm Nghi are recorded in her best known work Hạnh Thục ca, Song of Voyage to Thục.

References

External links
 Nguyễn Nhược Thị : Hạnh Thục ca online

19th-century Vietnamese poets
1830 births
1909 deaths
19th-century Vietnamese women writers
19th-century Vietnamese writers
Vietnamese women poets
Vietnamese ladies-in-waiting